Mopalia is a genus of chitons in the family Mopaliidae.

Species 
Species include:
Mopalia acuta
Mopalia ciliata
Mopalia cirrata
Mopalia egretta	 
Mopalia ferreirai
Mopalia hindsii
Mopalia imporcata
Mopalia laevior
Mopalia lignosa
Mopalia lionotus
Mopalia lowei	
Mopalia muscosa
Mopalia phorminx
Mopalia porifera
Mopalia recurvans
Mopalia sinuata	
Mopalia spectabilis
Mopalia swanii

References

Mopaliidae
Chiton genera